Delia Green (1886 – December 25, 1900) was a 14-year-old African-American murder victim who has been identified as the likely inspiration for several well-known traditional American songs, usually known by the titles "Delia" or "Delia's Gone" or "Little Delia."

History
According to contemporaneous reports published in Georgia newspapers, Green was shot by 15-year-old Mose (or Moses) Houston late on Christmas Eve, 1900, in the Yamacraw neighborhood of Savannah, Georgia, and died at 3:00 a.m. on Christmas Day. Houston, the newspapers implied, had been involved in a sexual relationship with Green for several months. The shooting took place at the home of Willie West, who chased down Houston after the shooting and turned him over to the city police.

Green's murder and Houston's trial in the spring of 1901 were reported in the Savannah Morning News and the Savannah Evening Press. Although Houston reportedly had confessed to the murder at the time of his arrest, at his trial, he claimed the shooting was accidental. Other witnesses, however, testified that Houston had become angry after Green called him "a son of a bitch."

Houston was convicted and sentenced to life in prison, on the jury's recommendation of mercy rather than the death penalty. In a clemency petition after the trial, Houston's attorney, Raiford Falligant, cast Houston as "a mere child" who "got into bad company and so unfortunately committed the act that he now suffers for."  After serving more than twelve years, he was paroled by Governor John M. Slaton in October 1913. Accounts of his later life are sketchy, but he is said to have died in New York City in 1927 after other brushes with the law.

Green was buried in an unmarked grave in Laurel Grove Cemetery South in Savannah.

Songs

Songs based on Delia Green's murder became both common and popular in the next few decades. In 1928, folklorist Robert Winslow Gordon reported to the Library of Congress that he had traced the songs back to a murder in Savannah and that he had interviewed both Green's mother and the police officer who took Houston into custody.

Gordon's research was never published, and Green's relationship to the popular songs was essentially unknown until Prof. John F. Garst, working from hints left by Gordon, turned up the details in Savannah newspaper archives.

The songs inspired by Green's murder now appear in two forms; both forms were staples of the "folk revival" of the 1950s and early 1960s. One version, usually attributed to Blake Alphonso Higgs, is known as "Delia's Gone." It is explicitly told from her killer's point of view. The second version, usually attributed to Blind Willie McTell, is usually known as "Delia" and is told from the point of view of a loved one of Delia's.

Among the many singers who have sung "Delia" are Bob Dylan and David Bromberg. Josh White and Pete Seeger each recorded "Delia's Gone" in 1955, followed by Harry Belafonte, Bud and Travis, Burl Ives, The Kingston Trio, and other "folk revival" singers. Pat Boone had a minor hit with "Delia Gone" in 1960, with the composition attributed to Caperton Henley.

It was recorded numerous times by country singers, including Bobby Bare, Waylon Jennings, and Johnny Cash. In the music video for Cash's fourth recording of the song, the role of Delia was played by Kate Moss.

The song "Delia's Gone" was such a staple of the folk revival of the 1960s that Steve Goodman used the melody and chorus for his song about Chicago Mayor Richard J. Daley, "Daley's Gone," released on his 1977 album "Say It In Private."

References

Bibliography

External links

1886 births
1900 deaths
1900 murders in the United States
Deaths by firearm in Georgia (U.S. state)
Female murder victims
Incidents of violence against girls
Murder ballads
Murdered African-American people
Murdered American children
People from Savannah, Georgia
People murdered in Georgia (U.S. state)
Violence against children